Barombia is a genus of grasshoppers in the subfamily Catantopinae with no tribe assigned.  Species can be found in Cameroun.

Species
The Orthoptera Species File lists a monotypic species Barombia tuberculosa Karsch, 1891.

References

External links 
 

Acrididae genera
Catantopinae 
Orthoptera of Africa